Tukul (also spelled "Tekul") is a term used to refer to round homes in Ethiopia, Eritrea, Sudan and other parts of eastern Africa.

A tukul appears in the flag of Ethiopian Southern Nations, Nationalities, and Peoples' Region, as a widespread symbol of local culture.

House types
Housing in Ethiopia